Chintzware, or chintz pottery, describes chinaware and pottery covered with a dense, all-over pattern of flowers (similar to chintz textile patterns) or, less often, other objects. It is a form of transferware where the pattern is applied by transfer printing as opposed to the more traditional method of painting by hand.

The main firms making chintzware were English, nearly all part of the huge Staffordshire pottery industry. including as Grimwades (trade name Royal Winton), A.G. Richardson & Co. (trade name Crown Ducal), James Kent Ltd., Shelley Potteries Ltd., and Elijah Cotton Ltd. (trade name Lord Nelson) and between them turned out a great variety of chintz dinnerware, teaware, and ornamental pieces mostly from the 1920s to the 1960s. There were over 50 different patterns in various colours available. While often made in pottery, some manufacturers such as Shelley produced bone china chintzware, particularly after World War II. Chintzware was also copied at the time by German, Czech and Japanese manufacturers.

Royal Winton began reproducing a few of their chintz patterns in the mid-to-late 1990s.

References

Further reading 
Eileen Rose Busby, Royal Winton Porcelain: Ceramics Fit for a King, Antique Publishers, 1998.
Susan Scott, The Charlton Standard Catalogue of Chintz, 3rd ed. Charlton Press, 1999.
Kelly L. Moran, Shelley Chintz: Unlocking the Secrets of the Pattern Books, Thaxted Cottage, 1999, .
Jo Anne P. Welsh, Chintz Ceramics, 3rd ed., Schiffer Publishing, 2000.
Francis Joseph Publications, The Chintz Collectors Handbook,  1999.
Muriel M. Miller, Collecting Royal Winton Chintz, Francis Joseph Publications, 1996.

Types of pottery decoration
Porcelain
Staffordshire pottery